Aleksandr Aleksandrovich Deyneka (May 20, 1899 – June 12, 1969) was a Soviet and Russian painter, graphic artist and sculptor, regarded as one of the most important Russian modernist figurative painters of the first half of the 20th century. His Collective Farmer on a Bicycle (1935) has been described as exemplifying the socialist realist style.

Life and career 
Deyneka was born in Kursk and studied at Kharkov Art College (pupil of Alexander Lubimov) and at VKhUTEMAS. He was a founding member of groups such as OST and Oktyabr, and his work gained wide exposure in major exhibitions. His paintings and drawings (the earliest are often monochrome due to the shortage of art supplies) depict genre scenes as well as labour and often sports. Deyneka later began painting monumental works, such as The Defense of Petrograd in 1928, which remains his most iconic painting, and The Battle of Sevastopol in 1942, The Outskirts of Moscow. November 1941 and The Shot-Down Ace. His mosaics are a feature of Mayakovskaya metro station in Moscow. He is in the highest category "1A - a world famous artist" in "United Art Rating".

Deyneka is buried in the Novodevichy Cemetery in Moscow.

Legacy
The title from one of Deyneka's works, "Work, Build and Don’t Whine", was used as the title for a 2016 exhibition of Socialist Realist art at London's Gallery for Russian Arts and Design. One modern critic, however, suggested that Deyneka's posters are less radical than his fore-bearers like Alexander Rodchenko, and as a result, less interesting.

Honours and awards
 Hero of Socialist Labour (1969)
 People's Painter of the USSR (1963)
 Order of Lenin
 Order of the Red Banner of Labour

Selected works

  Three Women's Figures, 1920s
 The Cabaret, 1921
 Перед спуском в шахту, 1924
 Football, 1924
 After the Rain. Kursk, 1925
 Springtime, 1925
 The Skiers, 1926
 Tennis, 1926
 На стройке новых цехов, 1926
 Textile Workers, 1927
 The Ode to the Spring, 1927
 The Defense of Petrograd, 1928, Central Museum of the Defense Forces of the USSR, Moscow
 Механизируем Донбасс! (poster), 1930
 Китай на пути освобождения от империализма (poster), 1930
 Надо стать самим специалистами (poster), 1930
 Book Cover, 1931
 The Interventionists' Mercenary, 1931
 On the Balcony, 1931
 Crosscountry Race, 1931
 A Girl at the Window. Winter, 1931
 Mother, 1932
 Soccer Game, 1932
 The Sleeping Boy With Cornflowers, 1932
 Noon, 1932
 The Football Player, 1932
 Кто кого?, 1932
 In the Airs, 1932
 The Night Landscape with Horses and Dry Grasses, 1933
 Girls Swimming, 1933
 Dry Leaves, 1933
 Resting Children, 1933
 Communists at Interrogation, 1933
 Физкультурница / Работать, строить и не ныть! (poster), 1933
 Without Work in Berlin, 1933
 The Pier, 1933
 The Race, 1933
 Runners, 1934
 Skiers, 1934
 Landscape with a Herd, 1934
 Goalkeeper, 1934
 A Pioneer. Kursk, 1934
 Crimean Pioneers, 1934
 A Parachuter above the Sea, 1934
 Quirinal Place, Rome, 1934
 Spanish Stairways, 1934
 A Street in Rome
 Monks, 1935
 An Italian motif, 1935
 The Park, 1935
 The Portrait of S.I.L. with the Straw Hat, 1935
 Tuileries, 1935
 Quai de la Seine, 1935
 Paris. In a Café, 1935
 Une parisienne, 1935
 Негритянский концерт, 1935
 The Boredom, 1935
 The Road to Mount-Vernon, 1935
 , 1935
 A Lunch Break in Donbass, 1935
 Первая пятилетка, 1936
 The Model, 1936
 The Future Pilots, 1937
  The Stakhanovites, 1937
 Woman in Red, 1939
 The Lilacs
 Nikitka – The First Russian Pilot, 1940
 The Left March, 1941
  The Outskirts of Moscow. November 1941
 Sverdlov Place in December 1941
 Evening. The Patriarch Ponds, 1941
 A Burned down Village, 1942
 Эвакуация колхозного скота
 Колхозницы роют противотанковые рвы на подступах к Москве
 Ремонт танков на прифронтовом заводе
 Танки идут на фронт
 Наступление началось
 The Defense of Sebastopol, 1942
 The Knocked down Ace, 1943
 Nude Woman Sitting, 1943
 Under Occupation, 1944
  Expanse, 1944
 Above the Devastated Berlin, 1944
 Berlin. The Day of the Declaration, 1945
 A Stadium in Berlin, 1945
 Near Kursk. Tuskor' River, 1945
 Relay Race (sculpture), 1945
 A Boxer (sculpture), 1947
 100-meter Race (sculpture), 1947
 The Relay Race on the Ring B, 1947
 Donbass, 1947
 The Studio Window, 1947
 In Sebastopol, 1947
 Self-portrait, 1948
 The Space of Building Sites under Moscow, 1949
 The Skiers (mosaic)], 1950
 Football Players (sculpture), 1950
 Перед забегом (sculpture), 1951
 A Nude Girl, 1951
 Дачный поселок Кратово, 1951
 In Sebastopol, 1947
 On the Skating Rink in Kratovo, 1951
 The Snow Maiden, 1954
 The Laying Woman with a Ball, 1954
 Still Life. Strawberries, 1955
 A Nude Model, 1955
 Football players (sculpture), 1955
 The Tractor Driver, 1956
 In Sebastopol, 1956
 Near the Sea, 1956–1957
 Putting the Shot (sculpture), 1957
 Голова парашютиста (mosaic), 1957
 A Nice Morning (mosaic)], 1959–1960
 Hockey Players (mosaic)], 1959–1960
 October Slogans of Peace by the Narvsky Gate, 1960
 A Milker (mosaic), 1962
 The Red Guardsman (mosaic), 1962
 A Villa in Rome, 1965
 The Young Designer, 1966
 In the South (detail), 1966
 Владимир Маяковский в РОСТА
 Летнее приволье
 Running Sportswoman (sculpture)
 The Cat and the Cook

See also
 List of Russian artists

References

External links

Biography and works of Alexander Deineka (Deyneka)
10 notable works of Deyneka

1899 births
1969 deaths
20th-century Russian painters
20th-century Russian sculptors
People from Kursk
Communist Party of the Soviet Union members
Full Members of the USSR Academy of Arts
Vkhutemas alumni
Heroes of Socialist Labour
People's Artists of the USSR (visual arts)
Lenin Prize winners
Recipients of the Order of Lenin
Recipients of the Order of the Red Banner of Labour
Mosaic artists
Socialist realist artists
Russian caricaturists
Russian educational theorists
Russian genre painters
Russian illustrators
Russian landscape painters
Russian male painters
Russian male sculptors
Russian portrait painters
Russian printmakers
Russian stained glass artists and manufacturers
Russian war artists
Russian watercolorists
Soviet educators
Soviet painters
Soviet printmakers
Soviet sculptors
Burials at Novodevichy Cemetery
Soviet educational theorists